Carrion refers to the carcass of a dead animal.

Carion, Carrion or Carrión may also refer to:

Geography
 Carion, Madagascar, former name of Nandihizana
 Carrión (river), a river in Spain
 Carrión de Calatrava, a municipality in central Spain
 Carrión de los Céspedes, a municipality in southern Spain
 Carrión de los Condes, a municipality in northern Spain

People
 Adolfo Carrión, Jr., a Bronx politician
 Alejandro Carrión, an Ecuadorian writer and journalist
 Audrey Carrion, an American judge
 Benjamín Carrión, an Ecuadorian writer
 Clodoveo Carrión Mora, an Ecuadorian naturalist
 Daniel Alcides Carrión, a Peruvian doctor who described Oroya fever
 Enrique Carrión, a Cuban boxer
 Jerónimo Carrión, an Ecuadorian president
 Jerónimo de Carrión (1660-1721), Spanish composer
 Marcelo Carrión (born 1956), Dominican chess player
 Noemí Carrión, a Spanish singer and actress
 Pedro Carrión, a Cuban boxer
 Carion the Egyptian, 4th-century Egyptian Christian monk

Animals
 Carrion beetle, a family of carnivorous beetles
 Carrion crow (Corvus corone), a bird of western Europe and eastern Asia

Arts, entertainment, and media

Fictional entities
 Carrion (comics), a villain in Spider-Man comics
 Carrion Road, a fictitious road associated with deaths connected to bullet smuggling, in The Hollow Point (2016)

Music
 Carrion, former name of Poltergeist (band), a Swiss power thrash metal band
 "Carrion", a song from Fiona Apple's Tidal (album)
 "Carrion" a song from Godflesh's A World Lit Only by Fire (album)
 "Carrion" a song from Parkway Drive's Horizons album
 "Carrion/Apologies to Insect Life", a song by the band British Sea Power
"Carrion", a song from Deerhunter's Fading Frontier
"Carrion", a song from Gengahr's Where Wildness Grows

Video game
 Carrion (video game), a horror video game

See also 
 Carreon (disambiguation)
 Carry On (disambiguation)
 Dead body